Danny Lamagna is an American musician; he is the drummer for rock bands Agnostic Front, Suicide City, and Sworn Enemy.

History

Suicide City 

In 2004, Lamagna started Suicide City with Groovenics singer Karl Bernholtz, Groovenics/Ghost Fight guitarist A. J. Marchetta, Kittie bassist Jennifer Arroyo, and Biohazard vocalist Billy Graziadei.

Sworn Enemy 

In 2010, vocalist Sal Lococo, bassist Jamin Hunt, and guitarists Lorenzo Antonucci and Jeff Cummings of hardcore band Sworn Enemy brought Lamagna in to perform drums with the ensemble.

Agnostic Front 

In 2022, it was revealed on Agnostic Front's Facebook page that Lamagna would be their new drummer after Pokey Mo's departure.

External links
Official Site
Suicide City Myspace page
Sworn Enemy official site

References

Agnostic Front members
American people of Italian descent
American rock drummers
Living people
Suicide City members
Year of birth missing (living people)